

United States of Mexico

This is a list of law schools and law faculties in Mexico.

 Escuela Libre de Derecho, School of Law
 Instituto Tecnológico Autónomo de México (ITAM), Faculty of Law
 Instituto Tecnológico y de Estudios Superiores de Monterrey (ITESM), Faculty of Law
 Universidad Autónoma del Estado de México, 
 Universidad Autónoma de Nuevo León, Facultad de Derecho y Criminología 
 Universidad Anahuac, Faculty of Law
 Universidad Nacional Autónoma de México (UNAM), Faculty of Law
 Universidad de Guanajuato, Faculty of Law
 Universidad La Salle, Faculty of Law
 Universidad Iberoamericana, Faculty of Law
 Universidad Panamericana, Faculty of Law
 Barra Nacional de Abogados (BNA) School of Law, 
 Centro Universitario Incarnate Word, 
Facultad Libre de Derecho de Monterrey, School of Law

Law schools in Mexico